Kinapeya Romeo Kone (born 1 September 1979 in Korhogo, Ivory Coast) is an Ivorian judoka. He competed at the 2012 Summer Olympics in the men's 90 kg event.

References 

1979 births
Living people
Ivorian male judoka
Olympic judoka of Ivory Coast
Judoka at the 2012 Summer Olympics
People from Korhogo
African Games bronze medalists for Ivory Coast
African Games medalists in judo
Competitors at the 2011 All-Africa Games